Abida Parveen (Urdu, ; born 20 February 1954) is a Pakistani singer, composer and musician of Sufi music. She is also a painter and entrepreneur. Parveen is one of the highest paid singers in Pakistan. Her singing and music has earned her many accolades, and she has been dubbed as the 'Queen of Sufi music'.

Born and raised in Larkana into a Sindhi Sufi family, she was trained by her father Ustad Ghulam Haider who was a famous singer and music teacher. She plays Pump organ, Keyboard and Sitar. Parveen started performing in the early 1970s and came into global prominence in the 1990s. Since 1993, Parveen has toured globally, performing her first international concert at Buena Park, California. She has also performed in Churches several times. Parveen features in Pakistan's popular musical show Coke Studio and was a judge on the pan-South Asia contest show Sur Kshetra alongside Runa Laila and Asha Bhosle hosted by Ayesha Takia. She had appeared in various Indian and Pakistani Music reality shows including Pakistan Idol, Chhote Ustaad and STAR Voice of India. She is among The 500 Most Influential Muslims of the world with the power to induce hysteria in her audience,  Parveen is a "Global Mystic Sufi Ambassador". In the last few years she has sung in a Pepsi commercial collaborating with Atif Aslam for this.

Parveen is regularly referred to as one of the world's greatest mystic singers. She sings mainly ghazals, thumri, khyal, qawwali, raga (raag), Sufi rock, classical, semi-classical music and her specialty, kafi, a solo genre accompanied by percussion and harmonium, using a repertoire of songs by Sufi poets. Parveen sings in Urdu, Sindhi, Punjabi, Arabic and Persian. Parveen notably sung a famous song in Nepali language called "Ukali Orali Haruma", originally by Nepali singer Tara Devi, in a concert in Kathmandu, Nepal and in 2017, she was designated a 'Peace Ambassador' by SAARC.

Parveen is best known for singing in an impassioned, loud voice, especially on the song Yaar ko Humne from the album Raqs-e-Bismil and Tere Ishq Nachaya which is a rendition of Bulleh Shah's poetry. She was bestowed Pakistan's second highest civilian award Hilal-e-Imtiaz in 2012 and the highest civilian award Nishan-e-Imtiaz in March 2021 by the President of Pakistan.

Early life

Parveen was born in Ali Goharabad in Larkana, Sindh, Pakistan. She received her musical training initially from her father, Ustad Ghulam Haider, whom she refers as Baba Sain and Gawwaya. He had his own musical school where Parveen got her devotional inspiration from. She and her father would often perform at shrines of Sufi Saints. Parveen's talent compelled her father to choose her as his musical heir over his two sons. Growing up, she attended her father's music school, where her foundation in music was laid. Later Ustad Salamat Ali Khan of the Sham Chaurasia gharana also taught and nurtured her. Parveen always remembers that she was never forced towards this occupation and she sang her first complete kalam when she was only 3 years old.

Career

Parveen had already begun performing at Dargahs and Urs in the early 1970s, but it was in 1973, on Radio Pakistan, that she achieved her first real breakthrough with the Sindhi song Tuhinje zulfan jay band kamand widha. In 1977 she was introduced as an official singer on Radio Pakistan. Since then, Parveen has risen to prominence and is now considered one of the finest vocal artists of Pakistan. She has imbued Sufi music with a new identity, marking the beginning of this journey at Sultana Siddiqui's Awaz-o-Andaz in 1980.

Parveen travels internationally, often performing at sold-out venues. Her 1988 performance in Chicago was recorded by the Hazrat Amir Khusrau Society of Art and Culture, which issued an LP of her songs. Her 1989 performance in London's Wembley Conference Centre was broadcast on the BBC. Parveen cites her motivation for international travel as being to spread Sufism, peace and the divine message. In doing so, she also promotes Pakistani culture.

In the 1990s Parveen licensed her spiritual ghazals to Bollywood, since her "spiritual brother", Khan, recorded songs for Bollywood. Recently Abida also performed at the grand finale of Sindh Festival arranged by Bilawal Bhutto Zardari in Thatta.

  Abida had a special appearance in the super hit Lollywood movie "Zindagi" starring Sultan Rahi, Arif Lohar, Attaullah Khan Esakhelvi in lead cast for which she performed her famous rendition of Sufi Sachal Sarmast 'mahi yar di gharoli bhar di'.
 In 2007, Parveen collaborated with Shehzad Roy on a song entitled Zindagi, dedicated to children's social problems .
 In the same year she performed at the annual Oslo mela in Norway.
 In 2010, Parveen performed at London's prestigious Royal Albert Hall, along with Bollywood playback singer Sonu Nigam.
 In 2010, Parveen performed at the Asia Society's Sufi Music Festival in New York City.
 In 2010, she performed in Union Square, Manhattan, in first Sufi Music Festival in New York City.
 Parveen performs annually at the Indian film-maker Muzaffar Ali's Jahan-e-Khusrau event where she is reputed to be the top performer.
 In 2010, she judged the Indo-Pak venture Sur Kshetra TV Show.
 She performed in Manchester International Festival, 2013 in Bridgewater Hall.
 Abida also collaborated in Manchester in 2013 with composer John Tavener for remarkable composition 'Mahamatar' for a Werner Herzog film about pilgrimage.
 She had performed in Holland festival 2014 in Stopera, Amsterdam.
 Praveen was the grand performer of Dhaka International Folk Fest, 2015 in Bangladesh where she also received an award.
 In the Sindh Literature Festival, 2016, she performed the grand show and cut the ribbon on its inauguration alongside SLF chairperson.
 In the same year, she performed 2nd International Sufi Festival at Karachi.
 In 2016, she collaborated with Indian Music director duo Salim–Sulaiman and an Orchestra in Toronto(Canada) for special song called "Noor e Illahi" released on Eid.
 In 2017, on new year eve Abida released 'Mulk e Khuda' a patriotic song featuring natural sites and landscapes of Pakistan.
 She has performed in the finale of Alchemy Festival, 2017 at Southbank Centre, London.
 In the same year a Music video of romantic gazal "Ahat Si" was released by Abida feat. Saima Ajram.
 Her performance includes the annual Faiz International Festival at the death anniversary of Faiz Ahmad Faiz.

Coke Studio appearances
Parveen began performing on the internationally acclaimed Pakistani show Coke Studio in 2010. She sang three songs: "Ramooz-e-Ishq", "Nigah-e-Darwaishaan", and "Soz-e-Ishq" in episodes 1 (Reason), 3 (Conception), and 5 (Realization), respectively of season 3. Parveen said she admired the programme because it offered a Dargahi environment. She commented:
"This project which Rohail Hyatt has started is indeed great and I would like to be a part of it for a long time. The music that comes out of this project reaches both the heart and soul and it always compliments the lyrics without overriding the true message of the kalams. This platform builds on those messages of our Sufi elders."

She was invited back in season 7 in 2014. She sang "Mein Sufi Hoon" with Rais Khan and performed "dost" as a solo. She also performed "Chaap Tilak" (A popular Sufi poem by Sufi poet Amir Khusro) in a duet with Rahat Fateh Ali Khan.

Abida was also a part of season 9. Her first song along with other artists in the season, "Ae Rah Haq K Shaheedo" was dedicated to the war martyrs. After that she sang a duet with Ali Sethi entitled "Aaqa", then solo an entitled "Maula-i-Kull".

She also performed in season 14, singing "Tu Jhoom" with Naseebo Lal.

Quotes 
 "Pakistan seems disconnected from the outside. But it is built and running on prayers of our Sufi kings, our pirs. Poor people, rich people – we are all God's servants … I'm lucky. My audience is my God."
 "The songs purify the soul of a human being, the human is so involved that he has left God. The songs bring us near to God, near the Almighty, so that the human soul should be purified and satisfied."

Personal life

Education
Abida got her master's degree from Sindh and also learnt Urdu, Sindhi and Persian specifically.

Marriage and family
In 1975, Abida married Ghulam Hussain Sheikh, senior producer at Radio Pakistan, who had retired from his job in the 1980s to manage and mentor Parveen's career. After he died of a heart attack on an international flight in the early 2000s, their daughter Maryam took up that role. There is a sense that Parveen's career has taken a more commercial route as a result of it. The couple has two daughters Pereha Ikram and Marium Hussain, and a son Sarang Latif who is a music director. All three children act as her advisors. Her family understands her need for riyaz ( daily vocal music practice) and its required space to do that practice.

Abida Parveen Gallery
Parveen is also interested in the arts. She owns the Abida Parveen Gallery which features jewellery, paintings, her music CDs, awards section and garments and accessories and is run by her daughters. She also has her own music recording studio there.

Clothing style
Parveen has a distinctive clothing style which she has created herself for ease and comfort. She wears long simple frocks buttoned up to the top covered with a coat.

Other
Parveen has taken Bayyat and became a disciple of Najeeb Sultan, her spiritual master. Parveen suffered a heart attack during a performance in Lahore on 28 November 2010. Angiography and angioplasty were performed on her. She regained her health soon after.

Awards and recognitions

 Pride of Performance Award (1984) by the President of Pakistan
 Latif Award (twice)
 Sindh Graduate Association Award
 Pakistan Television Award
 Sachal Sarmast Honor
 9th PTV Awards for Best Singer in 1998
 Sitara-e-Imtiaz Award (2005) by President Pervez Musharaff
 Hilal-e-Imtiaz Award (2012) by President Asif Ali Zardari
 Lifetime Achievement Award at the Kaladharmi Begum Akhtar Academy of Ghazal in India (2012).
 Honored at the 16th Pakistan Television Awards Ceremony-PTV Award. (2011)
 Nominated for Best Original Sound Track (OST) for Yaar Ko Hamne Jabaja Dekha at 12th Lux Style Awards. (2013)
 Wonder Woman of the Year (2013)
 1st ARY Film Awards for Best Playback Singer for the film Ishq Khuda (2014).
 Gold Crown on glorious 40 years in the Music Industry by the Sindhi Singers Association in Larkana. (2014)
 Pakistani Diplomat Javed Malik presented an Ambassador's Recognition Award in Dubai (2015). 
 Tributed at the 17th PTV Awards in the category of 'Legends'. (2012)
 3rd Hum Awards for excellence in Music . (2015)
 She had been awarded in Dhaka International Folk Fest 2015.
 She had been awarded in 2nd International Sufi Conference, 2016 in Karachi by famous politician Sharmila Farooqi.
 15th Lux Style Awards for best female singer(film)in 2016.
 Saima Ajram, a presenter at BBC Asian Network, presented a lifetime achievement award to her at her home in 2016.
 PISA Lifetime Achievement Award - 2020.
 Nishan-e-Imtiaz by President Arif Alvi - 23 March 2021.

Filmography
Although Parveen is a highly acclaimed singer, she has never rendered her voice to films. Her pre-recorded songs have been used in films, however, on the insistence of her fans and Farooq Mengal. Parveen appears less and less in interviews and television morning shows due to her shy personality. Parveen confesses that she keeps getting offers from Bollywood film-makers namely Subhash Ghai and Yash Chopra but she keeps declining them as she has immersed herself in Sufism and it is time-consuming to spread the Divine Message. She even got offers from Shah Rukh Khan for Ra.One and music director A.R.Rehman has offered her some songs, too.

Television

Films

Discography

References

External links

 

1954 births
Living people
20th-century Muslims
Pakistani ghazal singers
Pakistani qawwali singers
People from Larkana District
Performers of Sufi music
Recipients of the Pride of Performance
Pakistani Muslims
Sindhi people
Recipients of Sitara-i-Imtiaz
Recipients of Hilal-i-Imtiaz
Punjabi singers
Sindhi-language singers
Singers from Sindh
Punjabi-language singers
Pakistani folk singers
Women ghazal singers
Recipients of Latif Award
PTV Award winners
21st-century Pakistani women singers